Australian GamePro was a bi-monthly video games magazine published by IDG from 10 November 2003 to February 2007. The founding editor was Stuart Clarke, who was succeeded in January 2006 by Chris Stead. According to the latter, the magazine had doubled its sales from 2006 to 2007, but the decision to discontinue the publication came as a result of internal restructuring.

Special issues 
The Australian GamePro team put together a number of special issues, including:
 Ultimate PSP Buyer's Guide
 Ultimate Nintendo Buyer's Guide
 Ultimate Xbox 360 Buyer's Guide
 Your Complete Guide to Online Gaming
 Australian GamePro Presents World of Warcraft

References

2003 establishments in Australia
2007 disestablishments in Australia
Video game magazines published in Australia
Bi-monthly magazines published in Australia
Defunct magazines published in Australia
English-language magazines
Magazines established in 2003
Magazines disestablished in 2007
Magazines published in Sydney